Marion De Vries (August 15, 1865 – September 11, 1939) was a United States representative from California, a Member and President of the Board of General Appraisers and an Associate Judge and later Presiding Judge of the United States Court of Customs Appeals.

Education and career

Born on August 15, 1865, on a ranch near Woodbridge, San Joaquin County, California, De Vries attended the public schools. He received a Bachelor of Philosophy degree in 1886 from San Joaquin Valley College and a Bachelor of Laws in 1888 from University of Michigan Law School. He was admitted to the bar and entered private practice in Stockton, California from 1889 to 1900. He was an assistant district attorney for San Joaquin County from January 1893 to February 1897.

Congressional service

De Vries was elected as a Democrat to the United States House of Representatives of the 55th and 56th United States Congresses and served from March 4, 1897, to August 20, 1900, when he resigned to accept a federal judgeship.

Federal judicial service

De Vries received a recess appointment from President William McKinley on June 9, 1900, to a seat vacated by Joseph Biddle Wilkinson Jr. He was nominated to the same position by President McKinley on December 5, 1900. He was confirmed by the United States Senate on December 10, 1900. He served as President from 1906 to 1910. His service terminated on April 2, 1910, due to his elevation to the United States Court of Customs Appeals.

De Vries was nominated by President William Howard Taft on March 9, 1910, to the United States Court of Customs Appeals (later the United States Court of Customs and Patent Appeals), to a new Associate Judge seat authorized by 36 Stat. 11. He was confirmed by the Senate on March 30, 1910, and received his commission on March 30, 1910. His service terminated on June 28, 1921, due to his elevation to Presiding Judge of the same court.

De Vries was nominated by President Warren G. Harding on June 23, 1921, to the Presiding Judge seat on the United States Court of Customs Appeals vacated by Presiding Judge Robert Morris Montgomery. He was confirmed by the Senate on June 28, 1921, and received his commission the same day. His service terminated on October 31, 1922, due to his resignation.

Later career and death

After his resignation from the federal bench, De Vries returned to private practice in Washington, D.C. and New York City, New York from 1922 to 1939. He died on September 11, 1939, on his ranch near Woodbridge. He was interred in the family plot on the De Vries Ranch.

References

Sources

 
 

1865 births
1939 deaths
California lawyers
Judges of the United States Court of Customs and Patent Appeals
Members of the Board of General Appraisers
Democratic Party members of the United States House of Representatives from California
People from San Joaquin County, California
United States Article I federal judges appointed by Warren G. Harding
United States Article I federal judges appointed by William Howard Taft
20th-century American judges
United States Article I federal judges appointed by William McKinley
University of Michigan Law School alumni